Lalan Sarang (26 December 1938 – 9 November 2018) was an Indian film, theatre and television producer and actress in Marathi, Hindi, and Gujarati productions. She produced several plays. Sarang played important roles in many plays and films.

Awards
'Grahini Sachiv Award' of GaDiMa Pratishthan. लालन सारंग यांना ग.दि. माडगूळकर प्रतिष्ठानचा विद्याताई माडगूळकरांच्या स्मृतिप्रीत्यर्थ दिला जाणारा गृहिणी सखी सचिव या पुरस्काराने सन्मानित
 Pimpri Chinchwad Kalarang Sanskrutik Sanstha – Kalagaurav award पिंपरी-चिंचवडच्या कलारंग सांस्कृतिक संस्थेतर्फे कलागौरव पुरस्कार (२२-१-२०१५)
 president of the 87th Marathi Natya Sammelan at Kankavli.
 Jivan gaurav award 2017 अखिल भारतीय मराठी नाट्यपरिषदेच्या कोथरूड शाखेतर्फे जीवनगौरव पुरस्कार (२४ जानेवारी, २०१७)

Personal life 
Born in Goa as Lalan Paingankar, she had no family background in acting. She completed her schooling in Rammohan school in Mumbai. She completed her college in Siddharth college while doing service at Mumbai Kamgar Aayukt Karyalay.

Sarang's husband was Kamlakar Sarang, an actor and a theater director. He directed the controversial Vijay Tendulkar play Sakharam Binder, in which Lalan Sarang played the role of Champa. Sarang's son is Rakesh Sarang.

She was a culinary expert and ran a seafood restaurant Masemari on Tilak Road in Pune.

Sarang died on 9 November 2018 at Joshi Hospital in Pune.

Filmography

Film 
 Samna (1975) with Shriram Lagoo, Nilu Phule and others सामना
 Mahek (2007) with Shreya Sharma, Madan Deodhar, Anuya Bhagwat, Anuja Borkar and Dhiresh Joshi
 Ha Khel Savlyancha (1976) हा खेळ सावल्यांचा

Theatre
 Asha ya Doghi with Reema Lagoo
 Aakrosh आक्रोश (वनिता)
 Aarop आरोप (मोहिनी)
 Udyacha Sansar उद्याचा संसार
 Umbarthyavar maap thevle उंबरठ्यावर माप ठेविले
 Kamla कमला (सरिता)
 Kalchakra कालचक्र (दिग्दर्शन आणि अभिनय)
 Khol khol pani खोल खोल पाणी (चंद्राक्का)
 Gidhade गिधाडे (माणिक)
 Gharkul घरकुल
 Gharte amuche chan घरटे अमुचे छान (विमल)
 Chamakla Dhruvacha Tara चमकला ध्रुवाचा तारा
 Jangli Kabutar जंगली कबुतर (गुल)
 Jodidar जोडीदार (शरयू)
 To mi navhech तो मी नव्हेच
 Dhandevaik धंदेवाईक (चंदा)
 Bibi Kari Salam बिबी करी सलाम
 Baby बेबी (अचला)
 Mi Mantri Zalo मी मंत्री झालो
 Rathchakra रथचक्र ( ती)
 Ranicha Baag राणीचा बाग
 Lagnachi Bedi लग्नाची बेडी
 Sakharam Binder सखाराम बाइंडर (चंपा)
 Sambhushanchya Chalit संभूसांच्या चाळीत
 Sahaj Jinki Mana सहज जिंकी मना (मुक्ता)
 Suryast सूर्यास्त (जनाई)
 Steel Frame स्टील फ्रेम (हिंदी)

Television
 Rathchakra रथचक्र

Books
 Natakamagil Natya नाटकांमागील नाटय़ – (The drama behind the play) A book of memoirs of the incidents and experiences she went through during her days on stage.
 Mi ani mazya bhumika मी आणि माझ्या भूमिका
 Jagle jashi जगले जशी
 Bahardar kisse ani chatakdar pakkruti बहारदार किस्से आणि चटकदार पाककृती

References

Further reading
 Natakamagil Natya (Autobiography)

20th-century Indian actresses
Indian stage actresses
Indian television actresses
Actresses from Mumbai
1938 births
2018 deaths
Actresses in Marathi theatre